Elma railway station is located in the community of Elma, Manitoba, Canada. This station is currently in use by Via Rail. Transcontinental Canadian trains stop here. The community is part of the Rural Municipality of Whitemouth.

External links

 Elma railway station

Via Rail stations in Manitoba

Transport in Eastman Region, Manitoba